Donald Earl Miller (born 12 March 1946) is an American theologian, currently the Leonard K. Firestone Professor at University of Southern California.

Publications
Miller is author, co-author, or editor of the following:
The Case for Liberal Christianity (Harper & Row, 1981)
Writing and Research in Religious Studies, with Barry Jay Seltser (Prentice Hall, 1992)
Homeless Families: The Struggle for Dignity, with Barry Jay Seltser (University of Illinois Press, 1993)
Survivors: An Oral History of the Armenian Genocide, with Lorna Touryan Miller (University of California Press, 1993)
Reinventing American Protestantism (University of California Press, 1997)
GenX Religion, ed. with Richard Flory, (Routledge, 2000)
Armenia: Portraits of Survival and Hope, with Lorna Touryan Miller and photographs by Jerry Berndt (University of California Press, 2003)
Global Pentecostalism: The New Face of Christian Social Engagement, with Tetsunao Yamamori (University of California Press, 2007)
Finding Faith: The Spiritual Quest of the Post-Boomer Generation, with Richard Flory (Rutgers University Press, 2008)
Spirit and Power: The Growth and Global Impact of Pentecostalism, ed. with Richard Flory & Kimon Sargeant (Oxford University Press, 2013)
Becoming Human Again: An Oral History of the Rwandan Genocide Against the Tutsi (University of California Press, 2020)

References

University of Southern California faculty
American theologians
University of Southern California alumni
1946 births
Living people